Gigantic is an American literary journal that publishes fiction, art and interviews. In particular, it focuses on short prose or flash fiction. Print issues also have included a special poetry section entitled "The Seizure State," curated by celebrated American poet Joe Wenderoth. It publishes original work online at its website and once a year in a print format. Gigantic was founded in 2008 by four writers living in New York City.

Format
Gigantic is known for changing its layout and design significantly with each issue, as well as a focus on affordable pricing. Issues have ranged in price from 3 to 10 dollars. The layout is designed by Erin Grey West.

Issue 1
The first issue was printed on newsprint in a large fold-out format. It included a centerfold painting by Nathaniel Russell as well as work and dialogues with Malcolm Gladwell, Shane Jones, Ed Park, Tao Lin, Deb Olin Unferth, Gary Shteyngart and others.

Issue 2
Issue 2 was titled "Gigantic America" and focused on themes of Americana. The magazine was printed in a bound elongated format and included a series of limited edition trading cards designed by Andre Da Loba backed with writing by Deb Olin Unferth, Joe Wenderoth, Clancy Martin, Margo Jefferson, and others. Other writers in the issue included Blake Butler, Robert Coover, Lydia Millet, Sam Lipsyte, and comic artist Adrian Tomine.

Issue 3
Issue 3 was titled "Gigantic Indoors." The magazine was printed in the magazine's largest format yet and featured work from David Berman, Diane Williams, Joshua Cohen, and many others. Also included are dialogues with Gordon Lish and Lynne Tillman.

Issue 4
Issue 4 was titled "Gigantic Everything." The magazine was printed in a hand-constructed, accordion-fold format and included fiction from Robert Walser, Etgar Keret, and Tony Duvert, as well as dialogues with Lydia Davis, Julie Hecht, and Tao Lin, among others.

Issue 5
Issue 5 was titled "Gigantic Talk." The magazine featured a special call-in phone element and included work from Lydia Davis, Gary Indiana, David Ohle, and Sparrow. Also included are dialogues with Brian Christian and Travis Millard and Mel Kadel.

Issue 6
Issue 6 was titled "Gigantic Ha-Ha." The magazine featured new and newly translated work by Franz Kafka, Roz Chast, Jincy Willett, Amelia Gray, James Hannaham, and Osama Alomar, along with dialogues with Gabrielle Bell and J. Robert Lennon.

Gigantic Books
In 2015, Gigantic published its first book, Gigantic Worlds. The book is an anthology of science flash fiction stories with work from Charles Yu, Catherine Lacey, Ted Chiang, and Lynne Tillman.

Website
The website is updated most months with new content. One notable series has been the serialization of a picture-novel by Leni Zumas and Luca Dipierro entitled "Until I Find It."

Notable contributors
Gigantic has featured many notable writers and artists, including:
Robert Walser
Lydia Davis
Franz Kafka
Etgar Keret
David Berman
Robert Coover
Tao Lin
Julie Hecht
Jincy Willett
Joe Wenderoth
Lynne Tillman
Sparrow
Deb Olin Unferth
Leni Zumas
Ed Park
Thomas Doyle
Diane Williams
Gordon Lish
Joshua Cohen
Todd Zuniga
Clancy Martin
Shane Jones
Michael Kimball

See also 
List of literary magazines

References

External links
Gigantic official website
Gigantic Worlds website
Story by Etgar Keret
Story by Laura van den Berg
An exquisite corpse by Dan Bevacqua, Anelise Chen, Mitchell S. Jackson, and Lynne Tillman
Story by Paul Scheerbart
Story by Joe Mungo Reed
Gigantic interview with  Lydia Davis
Gigantic interview with Sam Lipsyte
Gigantic interview with Julie Hecht
Gigantic interview with Clancy Martin
Gigantic interview with Gary Shteyngart
listing in Duotrope

Reviews of Gigantic
Gigantic event review in Poets & Writers
Issue 1 review in NewPages.com
Issue 2 review at PANK
Gigantic/Opium/Bomb event review at The New York Observer

Literary magazines published in the United States
Annual magazines published in the United States
Magazines published in New York City
Magazines established in 2008